The Dave Patton House is a historic house in Mobile, Alabama, United States.  The two-story structure was built for Dave Patton, a local African American entrepreneur. He purchased this property in 1900 and completed the Mediterranean Revival style house, designed by local architect George Bigelow Rogers, in 1915.

Dave Patton was born in 1879 and began his career using two mules to haul merchandise for local merchants.  He gradually built up his own business, becoming a prominent real estate entrepreneur and contractor.  He is known to have built many of the area's roads and schools.  Patton died in 1927.  The property eventually passed into  the ownership of the Stewart Memorial C.M.E. Church and today serves as the parsonage for that church.  The house is included on the African American Heritage Trail of Mobile and was added to the National Register of Historic Places on June 12, 1987.

References
http://www.houstoncapitalwholesaleproperties.com

National Register of Historic Places in Mobile, Alabama
Houses on the National Register of Historic Places in Alabama
African American Heritage Trail of Mobile
Houses in Mobile, Alabama
George Bigelow Rogers buildings
Houses completed in 1915
Mediterranean Revival architecture in Alabama